Tine Rasch Hansen (born 10 April 1976) is a Danish professional racing cyclist who rides for Team BMS BIRN.

See also
 List of 2016 UCI Women's Teams and riders

References

External links
 

1976 births
Living people
Danish female cyclists
Place of birth missing (living people)